Amar (also Romanized as Amār and ‘Ammār; also known as Amār-e Mīānrūd) is a village in Kuhdasht-e Jonubi Rural District, in the Central District of Kuhdasht County, Lorestan Province, Iran. At the 2006 census, its population was 359, in 73 families.

References 

Towns and villages in Kuhdasht County